Washington's 4th legislative district is one of forty-nine districts in Washington state for representation in the state legislature. The district borders Idaho to the east, Washington's 6th legislative district to the south, Spokane to the west, and Washington's 7th legislative district on the north.

The largely suburban district is represented by state senator Mike Padden and state representatives Suzanne Schmidt (position 1) and Leonard Christian (position 2), all Republicans.

List of Washington House of Representatives

Position 1

Position 2

See also
Washington Redistricting Commission
Washington State Legislature
Washington State Senate
Washington House of Representatives

References

External links
Washington State Redistricting Commission
Washington House of Representatives
Map of Legislative Districts

04